Peasistilifer is a genus of parasitic sea snails, marine gastropod mollusks in the family Eulimidae.

Species
 Peasistilifer edulis Hoskin & Warén, 1983
 Peasistilifer gracilis (Pease, 1867)
 Peasistilifer koyamai (Habe, 1976)
 Peasistilifer nitidula (Pease, 1860)
 Peasistilifer obesula (A. Adams, 1854)
 Peasistilifer solitaria (Laseron, 1955)

References

 Warén A. (1980) Descriptions of new taxa of Eulimidae (Mollusca, Prosobranchia), with notes on some previously described genera. Zoologica Scripta 9: 283-306.

External links
 To World Register of Marine Species

Eulimidae